Gerardo Amarilla (born 1 February 1969) is an Uruguayan politician. He was President of the Chamber of Deputies of Uruguay between 1 March 2016 and 1 March 2017. He replaced . Amarilla is a member of the National Party.

Amarilla is an evangelical and he was the first evangelical to become President of the Chamber of Deputies. He has taken position against the decriminalization of abortion, the legalized sale of marijuana and same-sex marriage.

In the 2009 elections, he was elected to the Chamber of Deputies for the Rivera Department for the 2010–2015 period.

References

1969 births
Living people
Members of the Chamber of Representatives of Uruguay
National Party (Uruguay) politicians
Presidents of the Chamber of Representatives of Uruguay
Uruguayan evangelicals